Repnoye is a rural locality (a selo) in Belgorodsky District, Belgorod Oblast, Russia. The population was 468 as of 2010. There are 53 streets.

Geography 
Repnoye is located 8 km northeast of Maysky (the district's administrative centre) by road. Maysky is the nearest rural locality.

References 

Rural localities in Belgorodsky District
Belgorodsky Uyezd